Jessica Caicedo (born 13 October 1994) is a Colombian boxer. She originally won the gold medal in the women's 75kg at the 2019 Pan American Games but she was later disqualified after testing positive for a banned substance.

At the 2018 South American Games in Cochabamba, Bolivia she won the silver medal in the women's 75kg event. She also won the silver medal in the women's 75kg event at the 2018 Central American and Caribbean Games. In 2018 she also won the silver medal in the light heavyweight event at the 2018 AIBA Women's World Boxing Championships held in New Delhi, India.

References

External links 
 

Living people
1994 births
Place of birth missing (living people)
Colombian women boxers
Boxers at the 2015 Pan American Games
Boxers at the 2019 Pan American Games
Pan American Games competitors for Colombia
AIBA Women's World Boxing Championships medalists
Light-heavyweight boxers
Middleweight boxers
South American Games medalists in boxing
Competitors at the 2018 South American Games
Central American and Caribbean Games silver medalists for Colombia
Central American and Caribbean Games medalists in boxing
Competitors at the 2018 Central American and Caribbean Games
20th-century Colombian women
21st-century Colombian women